is a 1998 Japanese drama film directed by Nobuhiko Obayashi and based on the true story of Sada Abe. It was entered into the 48th Berlin International Film Festival.

Cast
 Hitomi Kuroki as Sada Abe
 Tsurutarō Kataoka as Tatsuzo Kikumoto
 Norihei Miki as Takuzo Abe
 Kippei Shiina as Masaru Okada
 Toshie Negishi as Yoshi Kikumoto
 Bengaru as Sanosuke Tachibana
 Renji Ishibashi as Shinkichi
 Kyūsaku Shimada as Takiguchi
 Jirō Sakagami as Miyazaki

References

External links

1998 films
Japanese drama films
1990s Japanese-language films
1998 drama films
Films directed by Nobuhiko Obayashi
Cultural depictions of Sada Abe
Japanese films based on actual events
Films about prostitution in Japan
1990s Japanese films